The Taito Type X is an arcade system board released in 2004 by game developer and publisher Taito.

Based on commodity personal computer hardware architecture, Type X is not a specification for a single set of hardware, but rather a modular platform supporting multiple hardware configurations with different levels of graphical capability.  This flexibility allows game developers limited choice in selecting a configuration to fit the game's specific requirements, and allows the platform as a whole to more efficiently support gaming titles with vastly different computing needs.  For example, the Type X+ and Type X2 models have upgrade graphics processing power, which could be put toward better game visuals, or outputting to higher-resolution (HDTV) displays. The Type X7 board is used primarily for pachinko machines in Japan. Rawiya co-owned the company that produced this system board. 

Taito Type X and X7 use Microsoft Visual Studio .NET 2003 Professional as the recommended development platform.

The Taito NESiCAxLive add-on allows arcade owners to use a digital distribution system to download games.

Specifications

Taito Type X/X+
 OS: Windows XP Embedded
 CPU: Intel Celeron 2.5 GHz, 400 MHz FSB (upgradeable to Celeron 2.0/2.8 GHz, Pentium 4 2.0 GHz/2.4 GHz/2.6 GHz/2.8 GHz/3.0 GHz, 400-800 MHz FSB)
 Chipset: Intel 865G
 RAM: DDR266 DIMM 256MB (upgradeable to DDR400 2GB), 2 memory slots
 GPU: (AGP-8x slot) Supported cards include ATI Radeon 9600 SE 128 MB, 9600 XT 128MB, X700 PRO 256MB
 Sound: AC'97 onboard 6 channel audio codec
 LAN: On board, 10/100 BASE-TX, NeSYS Compatible Controller
 I/O ports: 4 USB ports (1.1 & 2.0 compatible), 1 parallel port, 2 PS/2
 Audio inputs:  Microphone (stereo pin-jack), line-in (stereo pin-jack)
 Audio outputs: line-out (stereo pin-jack), SPDI/F
 Expansion slots: AGP (used by video card), 2× PCI
 Storage interface: 2 channel Parallel ATA (UATA-100/66/33), 2 channel SATA
 Media: PATA/SATA Hard disk

Type X+ uses a more powerful graphics board, allowing greater detail and effects (such as particle effects.)

Taito Type X7
 OS: Windows XP Embedded
 CPU: Intel Celeron M 600 MHz
 Chipset: Intel 855GME + ICH4
 RAM: 512MiB
 GPU: ATI Mobility Radeon 9550 (128MB)
 Sound: AC'97 onboard 6 channel audio codec
 Storage: 512MB-2GB flash ROM
 Audio outputs: 4 channel speaker

Taito Type X2
 OS: Windows XP Embedded
 CPU: Intel LGA 775 CPU. Supported CPUs include Celeron D 352, Pentium 4 651, Intel Core 2 Duo E6400
 Chipset: Intel Q965 + ICH8  (dg31pr +ich7)
 Video output: 640×480 (VGA), 1280×720 (HDTV 720p), 1920×1080 (HDTV 1080p)
 RAM: 667/800 MHz DDR2 SDRAM. Supported capacities 512 MB, 1 GB, 4 GB.
 GPU: PCI Express ×16-based graphics. Supported GPUs include ATI Radeon (x1600Pro, x1300LE) or Nvidia GeForce (7900GS, 7600GS, 7300GS)
 Sound: Onboard Realtek HD 7.1 channel Sound (supports add-in sound cards)
 LAN: 1000BASE-T 10/100BASE-TX
 I/O ports: 1 JVS, 4 USB 2.0, 1 serial (max 2), 1 parallel port, 2 PS/2, 2 SATA
 Audio inputs:  AKG C535EB Stage Microphone, line-in (Surround 7.1)
 Audio outputs: 7.1, SPDI/FX
 Expansion Slots: 1 PCI Express x16 (used by video card), 1 PCI Express x4, 2 PCI
 Storage: SATA 3Gbit/s Hard Drives

The Type X2 (stylized as Type X2) system-board uses an updated Intel platform with a PCI-express system bus, and supports more recent graphics GPUs and Intel CPUs than those supported by Type X.

Compatibility
Due to platform specific drivers (Windows XP Embedded), game software is not interchangeable between Type X2 and the older Type X/X+ platform.

Taito Type X2 Satellite Terminal
It is a variant of Taito Type X2, but supports networked multiplayer play.

Taito Type X Zero
 OS: Microsoft Windows Embedded Standard 7
 CPU: Intel Atom 230 1.6 GHz (533 MHz FSB)
 Chipset: MCP7A-ION
 Graphics: Nvidia GeForce 9400M
 Sound: 5.1 channel (HD Audio)
 Memory: 1 GB (DDR2 SDRAM), optional 2-4 GB
 USB: 6 ports
 Video output connectors: 2 ports (RGB+DVI or HDMI)
 LAN: 1 port (10/100/1000Mbit/s)
 Case Size: W 274 mm × D 197 mm × H 67 mm
 Power: AC 100–240 V
 Storage (optional): HDD: 250-1000 GB / SSD: 16 GB

Taito Type X3
 OS: Windows Embedded Standard 7 64bit / Windows XP Embedded SP3 32bit
 CPU: Intel Core i5-2400
 Chipset: Intel Q67 express
 Graphics: AMD Radeon HD 6770
 Sound: 7.1ch HD Audio
 Memory: DDR3 2GB
 Storage: HDD 160GB (2.5 inches)
 USB: USB3.0 in 2 groups + USB2.0 in 2 groups
 Network: 2 port 1 Gbit/s
 Serial: 1 port
 Power Supply: 600W

In addition, in Type X3 (stylized as Type X3), hardware configuration changes are possible for each game title, following the lineup is as an optional part.

 CPU: Intel Core i3-2120, Core i7-2600
 Graphics: Nvidia GeForce GTX 560 Ti/GTX 660/GT 640/GTX 760
 Memory: Up to 16GB
 Storage: Up to 3TB HDD
 SSD: 16GB

Taito Type X4
 OS: Windows Embedded 8 Standard / Windows Embedded Standard 7 64bit
 CPU: Intel Core i5-4590(S)
 Graphics: Nvidia GeForce GTX 960 2GB (GeForce GTX 1080 for Densha de Go!! and Starwing Paradox)
 Memory: DDR3 4GB (8GB for Densha de Go!!)
 Storage: HDD 3TB, 320GB Toshiba MQ01ABF032 SATA

Games

Type X / Type X+ games (2004–2013)

 Battle Gear 4 (2005)
 Battle Gear 4 Tuned (2006)
 Chaos Breaker (2004)
 Chase H.Q. 2 (2007)
 Data Carddass Dragon Ball Z (2005)
 Data Carddass Dragon Ball Z 2 (2006)
 Dinoking Battle / King of Jurassic (2005)
 Dinoking Battle II (2006)
 Dinoking Battle III (2007)
 Dinomax (2006)
 Dinomax Ver.1.5 (2007)
 Giga Wing Generations (2004)
 Goketsuji Ichizoku: Matsuri Senzo Kuyou (2009)
 Half-Life 2: Survivor (2006)
 Half-Life 2: Survivor Ver.2.0 (2007)
 Harikiri Online Professional Baseball (2004)
 Homura (2005)
 Inazuma Eleven ~ explosive football battle ~ (2010)
 Inazuma Eleven Go Battle Stadium (2011)
 Inazuma Eleven Go Batrism (2013)
 K-ON! Post-school rhythm time (2013)
 Katekyo Hitman Reborn! Southern Cross Battle (2008)
 Kirarin Revolution Happy Idol Life (2006)
 Mobile Suit Gundam: Spirits of Zeon (2006)
 Mobile Suit Gundam: Spirits of Zeon Memories (2007)
 Pokémon Battrio (2007)
 Raiden III (2005)
 Raiden IV (2007)
 Shikigami no Shiro III (2006)
 Spica Adventure (2005)
 Supreme!! Mecha Mote Chairperson Kurmote Girls Contest! (2009)
 Taisen Hot Gimmick 5 (2006)
 Taisen Hot Gimmick Mix Party (2005)
 Tetris The Grand Master 3: Terror Instinct (2005)
 Tetsudamasy (2011)
 The King of Fighters '98 Ultimate Match (2008)
 The King of Fighters: Sky Stage (2010)
 Trouble Witches AC (2009)
 Usagi: Yasei no Toupai Online (2005)
 Valve Limit R (2006)
 War of the Grail (2006)
 Won!Tertainment Music Channel (2006)
 Zoids Card Colosseum (2005)

Type X2 games (2007–2015)
(★ marked with dedicated software delivery NESiCAxLive)
 Akai Katana Shin for NESiCAxLive (2012) ★
 Aquapazza: Aquaplus Dream Match (2011) ★
 Aquarian Age Alternative (2007)
 Arcana Heart 2 for NESiCAxLive (2012) ★
 Arcana Heart 3 Love Max!!!!! (2013) ★
 Arcana Heart 3 Love Max Six Stars!!!!!! (2014) ★
 Battle Fantasia (2007)
 Battle Fantasia Network Edition for NESiCAxLive (2011) ★
 Battle Gear 4 Tuned 2010 (2010)
 BlazBlue: Calamity Trigger (2008)
 BlazBlue: Central Fiction (2015) ★
 BlazBlue: Chronophantasma (2012) ★
 BlazBlue: Continuum Shift (2009)
 BlazBlue: Continuum Shift II (2010) ★
 Chaos Breaker for NESiCAxLive (2012) ★
 Chaos Code: New Sign of Catastrophe (2013) ★
 Cho Chabudai Gaeshi! (2009)
 Cho Chabudai Gaeshi! 2 (2010)
 Cho Chabudai Gaeshi! Kyojinnohoshi (2011)
 Crimzon Clover for NESiCAxLive (2013) ★
 Cyber Diver (2009)
 D1GP Arcade (2007)
 Daemon Bride - Additional Gain (2011) ★
 Darius Burst: Another Chronicle (2010)
 Darius Burst: Another Chronicle EX (2011)
 Dark Awake for NESiCAxLive (2012) ★
 Do Not Fall (2013) ★
 Dragon Dance for NESiCAxLive (2011) ★
 Dragon Quest Monster Battle Road (2007)
 Dragon Quest Monster Battle Road II Legends (2009)
 Dragon Quest Monster Battle Road Victory (2010)
 E-Mahjong (2013) ★
 Elevator Action Death Parade (2009)
 Elevator Action for NESiCAxLive (2014) ★
 EN-Eins Perfektewelt for NESiCAxLive (2012) ★
 Exception for NESiCAxLive (2011) ★
 Gaia Attack 4 (2010)
 Gouketsuji Ichizoku: Matsuri Senzo Kuyou for NESiCAxLive (2012) ★
 Homura for NESiCAxLive (2012) ★
 Hopping Road (2009)
 Hopping Road Kids (2010)
 Hyper Street Fighter II: The Anniversary Edition for NESiCAxLive (2014) ★
 Ikaruga for NESiCAxLive (2013) ★
 The King of Fighters: Maximum Impact Regulation A (2007)
 Legendary Block King (2012)
 Lord of Vermilion (2008)
 Lord of Vermilion II (2009)
 Lord of Vermilion Re:2 (2011)
 Magical Beat (2012) ★
 Monster Hunter Nikki Angrily Pooh Ghee Race (2013)
 Music Gun Gun! (2009)
 Music Gun Gun! 2 (2011)
 Music Gun Gun!: Uta ga Ippai Cho Zokaban (2010)
 Nitroplus Blasterz: Heroines Infinite Duel (2015) ★
 Oppopo Booom (2009)
 Panic Museum / Haunted Museum (2009)
 Persona 4: The Ultimate in Mayonaka Arena (2012) ★
 Persona 4: The Ultimax Ultra Suplex Hold (2013) ★
 Pretty Rhythm (2010)
 Psychic Force 2012 for NESiCAxLive (2012) ★
 Puzzle Bobble for NESiCAxLive (2012) ★
 Raiden III for NESiCAxLive (2012) ★
 Raiden IV for NESiCAxLive (2012) ★
 Samurai Shodown: Edge of Destiny / Samurai Spirits Sen (2008)
 Samurai Spirits Sen for NESiCAxLive (2011) ★
 Senko No Ronde Duo - Dis-United Order (2009)
 Senko No Ronde Duo - Dis-United Order for NESiCAxLive (2011) ★
 Senor Nippon! (2009)
 Shh...! Welcome to Frightfearland / Haunted Museum II (2010)
 Skullgirls 2nd Encore (2015) ★
 Sonic Blast Heroes (2011)
 Sonic Blast Heroes Dash (2012)
 Space Invaders for NESiCAxLive (2012) ★
 Spica Adventure for NESiCAxLive (2011) ★
 Strania -The Stella Machina- (2011) ★
 Street Fighter III 3rd Strike: Fight for the Future for NESiCAxLive (2014) ★
 Street Fighter IV (2008)
 Street Fighter Zero 3 for NESiCAxLive (2014) ★
 Suggoi! Arcana Heart 2 for NESiCAxLive (2012) ★
 Super Street Fighter IV: Arcade Edition (2010)
 Super Street Fighter IV: Arcade Edition Ver.2012 (2011)
 The King of Fighters '98 Ultimate Match Final Edition for NESiCAxLive (2011) ★
 The King of Fighters 2002 Unlimited Match for NESiCAxLive (2011) ★
 The King of Fighters XII (2009)
 The King of Fighters XIII (2010)
 The King of Fighters XIII Climax (2012)
 The King of Fighters XIII Climax for NESiCAxLive (2013) ★
 The pieces Naimmentanpin-Doradorara~tsu miss! (2014) ★
 The Rumble Fish 2 for NESiCAxLive (2012) ★
 Trouble Witches AC for NESiCAxLive (2012) ★
 Ultra Street Fighter IV (2014) ★
 Vampire Savior for NESiCAxLive (2014) ★
 Wacky Races (2009)
 Yatagarasu: Attack on Cataclysm (2015) ★
 Yuukyuu no Sharin: Eternal Wheel (2007)

Type X Zero games (2011–)
 Card de Renketsu! Densha de Go! (2012)
 Groove Coaster (2013)
 Groove Coaster 2 Heavenly Festival (2015)
 Groove Coaster 3 Link Fever (2016)
 Groove Coaster 3 EX Dream Party (2017)
 Groove Coaster 4 Starlight Road (2018)
 Groove Coaster 4 EX Infinity Highway (2019)
 Groove Coaster 4 MAX Diamond Galaxy (2020)
 Groove Coaster EX (2014)
 Kickthrough Racers (2011)
 Mogutte Horehore (2011)

Type X3 games (2012–)
(★ marked with dedicated software delivery NESiCAxLive / NESiCAxLive2)
 BlazBlue: Central Fiction for NESiCAxLive2 (2017) ★ (NESICAxLive2)
 BlazBlue: Cross Tag Battle (2019) ★ (NESICAxLive2)
 Chousoku Henkei Gyrozetter (2012)
 Dragon Quest Monster Battle Scanner (2016)
 Fight! Dragon Quest Scan Butlers (2017)
 EN-Eins Perfektewelt Anastasis for NESiCAxLive2 (2023) ★
 Fighting EX Layer (2018) ★ (NESICAxLive2)
 Figure Heads Aces (2017)
 Gunslinger Stratos (2012)
 Gunslinger Stratos 2 (2014)
 Gunslinger Stratos 3 (2016)
 Gunslinger Stratos Σ (2017)
 Left 4 Dead -Survivors- (2014)
 Lord of Vermilion III (2013)
 Lord of Vermilion III ArK-cell (2014)
 Lord of Vermilion III Chain-Gene (2015)
 Lord of Vermilion III Twin Lance (2014)
 Lord of Vermilion IV (2017)
 Lord of Vermilion Re:3 (2015)
 Lord of Vermilion Re:3 Dear Servant (2016)
 Lord of Vermilion Re:3 Dear Servant -Saviour of the 13 Swords- (2016)
 Ma Dolomiti Dragon Solazur Kingdom -Puzzle & Dragons Battle Tournament- (2014)
 Million Arthur: Arcana Blood (2017) ★ (NESiCAxLive2)
 Samurai Spirits (2019) ★ (NESICAxLive2)
 School of Ragnarok (2015)
 School of Ragnarok Re:Boot (2015)
 SNK Heroines AC: Tag Team Frenzy (2018) ★ (NESiCAxLive2)
 Theatrhythm Final Fantasy – All-Star Carnival (2016)
 The King of Fighters XIV Arcade Ver. (2017) ★ (NESiCAxLive2)
 Ultra Street Fighter IV (2014) ★ (NESiCAxLive)

Type X4 games (2016–)
 Densha de Go!! (2017)
 Love Live! School Idol Festival: After School Activity (2016)
 Love Live! School Idol Festival: After School Activity Next Stage (2018)
 Magicians Dead (2016)
 Magicians Dead Next Blazing (2017)
 Starwing Paradox (2018)
 Street Fighter V: Type Arcade (2019)
 Street Fighter 6: Type Arcade'' (2023)

Current third-party developers
 Arc System Works
 Atlus
 Bandai Namco Entertainment
 Capcom
 Examu
 SNK
 Takara Tomy

See also
 Taito NESiCAxLive
 Taito NESYS

References

External links
  
  System specifications: Type X, X7, X2, X Zero
 French article on the Taito Type X2 and relative

Taito arcade system boards
x86-based computers